This is a list of Academy Award winners related to other winners. Honorary awards are included. In many instances, family members shared awards. These awards are counted only once for each family.

Results reflect awards through the 94th Academy Awards for 2021.

Extended family 
This list includes winners who are direct relatives of other winners, including in-laws, aunts/uncles and first cousins.

The Shearers have the most wins, with 16. The Newmans have been nominated the most often, all 95 being for Film Scoring, Arrangement, or Original Song.

The Coppolas have the most nominated (9) and winning (7) members.

The Hustons were the first three generation family of winners. The others are the Coppolas and, technically, the Farrow/Previn/Allens.

There are only two instances of a parent and child receiving acting nominations in the same film:
Henry Fonda and Jane Fonda in On Golden Pond.
Diane Ladd and Laura Dern in Rambling Rose.

There are only two instances of three family members being nominated for a single award:
Brothers Bob and Lee Minkler, and their nephew Michael Minkler were nominated for Sound work on Tron.
Jim Sheridan and his daughters Naomi and Kirsten Sheridan shared the Screenplay nomination for In America.

Relationships noted show relation to first family member listed.

Siblings 
The Sherman Brothers shared all their nominations and awards. The Coen brothers have shared all of their awards and 12 of their nominations (including two nominations under the pseudonym Roderick Jaynes); each received an individual nomination for Fargo.

Sisters Olivia de Havilland and Joan Fontaine were both nominated for Best Actress in 1942, with Fontaine winning for Suspicion. They are the only siblings to have both won lead acting awards, and the only pair of sisters to have awards.

Sisters Vanessa and Lynn Redgrave were both nominated for Best Actress in 1966 (for Morgan – A Suitable Case for Treatment and Georgy Girl, respectively), both losing to Elizabeth Taylor in Who's Afraid of Virginia Woolf?.

There are three sets of twins on the list:
Julius / Philip G. Epstein
Richard / Paul Sylbert
Wolfgang / Christoph Lauenstein

The Marx Brothers were cited in an honorary award given to Groucho Marx in 1973.

The Lucas Brothers are the first black siblings nominated for any award.

In addition to siblings mentioned directly above, these six sets of siblings have both earned acting nominations:
Maggie and Jake Gyllenhaal
Meg and Jennifer Tilly
Julia and Eric Roberts
Jane and Peter Fonda
River and Joaquin Phoenix
Vanessa and Lynn Redgrave

Jane and Peter Fonda's father Henry Fonda also was nominated and won for acting.

Vanessa and Lynn Redgrave's father Michael Redgrave was also nominated for acting.

Maggie and Jake Gyllenhaal's mother Naomi Foner Gyllenhaal was also nominated for writing, as was Maggie at the 94th Academy Awards.

One winning family has two generations of nominated siblings: Sofia Coppola has won for writing and been nominated for best picture and best director, and her brother Roman Coppola has been nominated for writing. Their father Francis Ford Coppola, who has multiple wins, and his sister (their aunt) Talia Shire have also both been nominated.

Couples 
These are the spouses who have won Academy Awards, though not necessarily while they were married.

Only two couples have won awards for Best Actor/Actress: Laurence Olivier / Vivien Leigh and Joanne Woodward / Paul Newman.

Michael Douglas/Catherine Zeta-Jones and Nicolas Cage/Patricia Arquette have Best Actor and Best Supporting Actress wins.

Javier Bardem and Penélope Cruz each have Best Supporting Actor/Actress awards.

Four couples have been nominated for performances in the same film: 
Alfred Lunt and Lynn Fontanne for The Guardsman
Charles Laughton and Elsa Lanchester for Witness for the Prosecution
Richard Burton and Elizabeth Taylor for Who's Afraid of Virginia Woolf?
Kirsten Dunst and Jesse Plemmons for The Power of the Dog 

Only one couple has ever competed head-to-head for the same award. In 2010, Kathryn Bigelow won for directing/producing The Hurt Locker, beating ex-spouse James Cameron, nominated for his film Avatar.

Julie Andrews, Lauren Bacall, and Angelina Jolie have each been married to two other winners (Tony Walton/Blake Edwards, Humphrey Bogart/Jason Robards, and Billy Bob Thornton/Brad Pitt, respectively).

Judy Garland / Vincente Minnelli and Liza Minnelli / Peter Allen constitute the only instance in which a member of a winning couple (Liza Minnelli) has a parent (in this case, both parents) who is also a member of a winning couple.

Producers Kathleen Kennedy and Frank Marshall were jointly awarded the Irving G. Thalberg Memorial Award in 2018.

Shared awards 
All the awards and nominations for these couples were for films they worked on together:

Separate awards 
Couples with at least one unshared award or nomination:

Other 
Carl Laemmle Jr. (1/1/0), who produced Best Picture winner All Quiet on the Western Front but was not nominated for the award because at the time the production company (in this case Universal) and not individual producers were nominated, and director William Wyler (3/14/1) (Mrs. Miniver), were cousins.

Susan Sarandon (1/5/0) (Dead Man Walking) has two children with former partner Tim Robbins (1/2/0) (Mystic River). Robbins directed Sarandon in her winning performance in Dead Man Walking. Sarandon's first husband, Chris Sarandon, has one nomination of his own (Supporting Actor, Dog Day Afternoon).

Ingmar Bergman (3/12/1) and Liv Ullmann (0/2/1) have a daughter together.

Notes

References

External links 
 Oscars.Org

Families